Soundz of Freedom (also known as Soundz of Freedom: My Ultimate Summer of Lo♥e Mix) is a Bob Sinclar album released on 21 May 2007 on Tommy Boy Entertainment. The cover design is by James Rizzi.

Track listing
"Sound of Freedom" (with Cutee B featuring Gary Pine and Dollarman)
"Rock This Remix 2007" (featuring Dollarman and Big Ali)
"What I Want" (pres. Fireball)
"Hard" (featuring The Hard Boys)
"Kiss My Eyes" (Cubeguys Remix)
"I Feel For You" (Axwell Remix)
"Everybody Movin’" (Part 1) (Kurd Maverick and Eddie Thoneick Remix)
"Everybody Movin’" (Part 2) (Guy Schreiner Remix)
"Ultimate Funk" (featuring Big Ali) (Tocadisco Remix)
"The Beat Goes On" (Mousse T. Remix)
"Champs Elysées Theme" (Jamie Lewis Remix)
"Tribute" (featuring Michael Robinson and Ron Carroll)
"Together" (featuring Steve Edwards)
"Give a Lil’ Love" (Part 2) (Eric Kupper Remix)

There is another version of "Everybody Movin'" on the Australian release of this album (15 August 2007)

Pressing error
Due to a pressing error on the Australian version, track 14, "Give a Lil' Love" (Part 2) (Eric Kupper Remix), was placed first and all tracks are subsequently pushed down a spot.

Charts

Weekly charts

Year-end charts

References

External links
 

2007 albums
Bob Sinclar albums
Tommy Boy Records albums